is the first EP by Japanese Darkwave duo, Aural Vampire. The EP was released independently on January 1, 2005.

Track listing

Personnel 
Exo-Chika – vocals, lyrics 
Raveman – production

External links
Official Website

References

2005 EPs
Japanese-language EPs